Farbod (Persian: فربد) is a Persian name which means "the protector of glory".
The name dates back to before the Muslim conquest of Persia when the Persian Empire embraced its ancient religion, Zoroastrianism.

Etymology 
According to Shahnameh, it is written with a Ferdowsi, which is a "bold" suffix that comes after each word to show ownership. For example, in Persian, "sepah" means army, while "sepahbod" means someone who is in control of an army: the equivalent of English word General.

References
 

Given names
Persian mythology
Persian masculine given names